The 1970 Queen's Club Championships, also known by its sponsored name Rothmans Open London Grass Court Championships, was a combined men's and women's tennis tournament played on grass courts at the Queen's Club in London in the United Kingdom. It was a non-tour event, i.e. not part of the 1970 Pepsi-Cola Grand Prix or 1970 World Championship Tennis circuit . It was the 71st edition of the tournament and was held from 15 June through 20 June 1970. First-seeded Rod Laver and Margaret Court won the singles titles. In the final Court was 2–6, 0–5 and 0–15 down against Winnie Shaw but recovered by winning 14 of the last 17 games.

Finals

Men's singles

 Rod Laver defeated  John Newcombe 6–4, 6–3
 It was Laver's 3rd title of the year and the 15th of his professional career.

Women's singles
 Margaret Court defeated  Winnie Shaw 2–6, 8–6, 6–2

Men's doubles

 Tom Okker /  Marty Riessen defeated  Arthur Ashe /  Charlie Pasarell 6–4, 6–4
 It was Okker's 1st title of the year and the 10th of his career. It was Riessen's 2nd title of the year and the 7th of his career.

Women's doubles
 Rosie Casals /  Billie-Jean King defeated  Karen Krantzcke /  Kerry Melville 6–4, 6–3

Mixed doubles
 Winnie Shaw /  Owen Davidson defeated  Evonne Goolagong /  Bob Giltinan 8–6, 13–11

References

External links
 
 ATP tournament profile

 
Queen's Club Championships
Queen's Club Championships
Queen's Club Championships
Queen's Club Championships
Queen's Club Championships